Mokdad Sifi (born 21 April 1940 in Tébessa) is an Algerian politician. Sifi was Head of Government of Algeria from 11 April 1994 to 31 December 1995. He was a Member of Parliament and once considered running for the Presidency. However, Sifi withdrew in April 1999 along with six of the seven other candidates, allowing the only remaining candidate, Abdelaziz Bouteflika, to become president. Sifi was said to have favored a market-oriented economy and no amnesty for the Islamic Salvation Front.

Known Ministers 
 Said Abadou (Minister for War Veterans)
 Sassi Aziz (Minister for Trade)
 Boubakour Benbouzid (Minister of Higher Education)

References

Sources
 "The candidates who pulled out" BBC News, 15 April 1999

1940 births
Living people
Members of the People's National Assembly
21st-century Algerian people